Karl Boo  (9 September 1918 – 22 February 1996) was a Swedish politician. He was a member of the Centre Party. He was a member of the Parliament of Sweden (lower chamber) 1961–1970, and of the unicameral parliament 1970–1988. From 1979 to 1982 he was minister for physical planning and local government in the Government of Sweden.

From 1977 to 1980, Boo was the president of the Swedish Association of Local Authorities (Svenska Kommunförbundet), an association that existed from 1969 to 2007 (now part of the Swedish Association of Regions) to interact with the Riksdag of Sweden.

1918 births
1996 deaths
Members of the Riksdag 1968–1970
Government ministers of Sweden
Members of the Riksdag from the Centre Party (Sweden)
20th-century Swedish politicians